South New Brighton is a coastal suburb on the eastern side of Christchurch city.

The suburb was officially named in 1953, after a suggestion that it be called South Brighton was rejected because there is already Brighton near Dunedin.

South Brighton Community Hall opened in 1961. It was damaged by the 2010-2011 earthquakes and demolished. In 2013, a preschool building was moved from QEII Park to the site as a replacement.

Demographics

South New Brighton had a population of 3,234 at the 2018 New Zealand census, an increase of 6 people (0.2%) since the 2013 census, and a decrease of 411 people (-11.3%) since the 2006 census. There were 1,287 households. There were 1,596 males and 1,641 females, giving a sex ratio of 0.97 males per female. The median age was 39.2 years (compared with 37.4 years nationally), with 684 people (21.2%) aged under 15 years, 519 (16.0%) aged 15 to 29, 1,575 (48.7%) aged 30 to 64, and 453 (14.0%) aged 65 or older.

Ethnicities were 92.5% European/Pākehā, 13.0% Māori, 3.2% Pacific peoples, 2.6% Asian, and 2.3% other ethnicities (totals add to more than 100% since people could identify with multiple ethnicities).

The proportion of people born overseas was 20.4%, compared with 27.1% nationally.

Although some people objected to giving their religion, 62.2% had no religion, 26.3% were Christian, 0.3% were Hindu, 0.2% were Muslim, 0.6% were Buddhist and 2.6% had other religions.

Of those at least 15 years old, 576 (22.6%) people had a bachelor or higher degree, and 393 (15.4%) people had no formal qualifications. The median income was $34,300, compared with $31,800 nationally. The employment status of those at least 15 was that 1,296 (50.8%) people were employed full-time, 423 (16.6%) were part-time, and 102 (4.0%) were unemployed.

Education
South New Brighton School is a full primary school catering for years 1 to 8.

References

Suburbs of Christchurch